Decker Township is located in Richland County, Illinois. As of the 2010 census, its population was 406 and it contained 170 housing units.

History 
Decker Township bears the name of Thomas J. Decker, a local pioneer.  Before May 2, 1859, the township was known as Jackson Township.

Geography

Demographics

References

External links
City-data.com
Illinois State Archives

Townships in Richland County, Illinois
Townships in Illinois